Hopkins Pond may refer to:

Hopkins Pond (New Hampshire), a waterbody on the south slope of Ragged Mountain
Hopkins Pond (park), a park in Camden Country, New Jersey
Hopkins Pond (New Jersey), a waterbody in the above park